The 1915 Navy Midshipmen football team represented the United States Naval Academy during the 1915 college football season. In its first season under head coach Jonas Ingram, the team compiled a  record and was outscored by a combined score of 118 to 99.

The annual Army–Navy Game was played on November 27 at the Polo Grounds in New York City; Army won

Schedule

References

Navy
Navy Midshipmen football seasons
Navy Midshipmen football